The 2012 West Virginia Democratic presidential primary was held on May 8, 2012 as part of the 2012 Democratic presidential primaries. 

Incumbent president Barack Obama ran virtually unopposed for renomination, although several minor candidates challenged Obama in a handful of state contests, including West Virginia. Barack Obama won the primary against virtually unknown convicted felon and perennial candidate Keith Judd by a roughly 19-point margin, a relatively narrow victory that received national attention and was explained with Obama's general unpopularity in West Virginia.

Procedure 
West Virginia was given a 20% pledged delegate bonus due to the primary being held during Stage 3 of the primary season. In total, the state was allocated 47 delegates to the Democratic National Convention: 36 were allocated based on the results of the primary, with the other 11 being unpledged superdelegates.

In order to qualify for delegates, a candidate must receive at least 15% of the vote statewide or in at least one congressional district. 12 of West Virginia's delegates were allocated based on the statewide popular vote, consisting of eight at-large delegates and four pledged PLEOs (party leaders and elected officials). Each of West Virginia's three congressional districts were allotted eight pledged delegates.

Results 
Judd would have won 15 delegates for the Democratic National Convention but he had not registered any delegates before the primary election to fill the spots, and so all delegates went to Obama.

Vote by county

References 

West Virginia
Democratic presidential primary
West Virginia Democratic primaries